The Truth in Savings Act (TISA) is a United States federal law that was passed on December 19, 1991. It was part of the larger Federal Deposit Insurance Corporation Improvement Act of 1991 and is implemented by Regulation DD. It established uniformity in the disclosure of terms and conditions regarding interest and fees when giving out information on or opening a new savings account. On passing this law, the US Congress noted that it would help promote economic stability, competition between depository institutions, and allow the consumer to make informed decisions.

The Truth in Savings Act requires the clear and uniform disclosure of rates of interest (annual percentage yield or APY) and the fees that are associated with the account so that the consumer is able to make a meaningful comparison between potential accounts. For example, a customer opening a certificate of deposit account must be provided with information about ladder rates (smaller interest rates with smaller deposits) and penalty fees for early withdrawal of a portion or all of the funds.

The Act is only applicable to deposit accounts that are held by a "natural person" for personal, household, or family use. Accounts owned by businesses or organizations such as churches and neighborhood associations are not subject to these rules.

See also 
 Truth in Lending Act

References 
 FDIC Law, Regulations, and Related Acts - text of the Act

External links 
 Federal Deposit Insurance Corporation Improvement Act of 1991 as amended (PDF/details) in the GPO Statute Compilations collection

102nd United States Congress
1991 in law
United States federal banking legislation
Federal Deposit Insurance Corporation
Savings and loan crisis
1991 in American politics
1991 in economics
1991 in the United States